Jim Wood (13 October 1952 – 26 August 2020) was a British biathlete. He competed at the 1980 Winter Olympics and the 1984 Winter Olympics.

References

1952 births
2020 deaths
British male biathletes
Olympic biathletes of Great Britain
Biathletes at the 1980 Winter Olympics
Biathletes at the 1984 Winter Olympics
People from Sherborne
Sportspeople from Dorset